Events in the year 1759 in Norway.

Incumbents
Monarch: Frederick V

Events

Arts and literature

Births

23 May – Johan Ernst Mowinckel, merchant and consul (died 1816).
2 July – Niels Andreas Vibe, military officer (died 1814).
2 August – Johan Christopher Haar Daae, priest and politician (died 1827)
13 August – Niels Hertzberg, priest and politician (died 1841).
23 October – Sivert Aarflot, educator (died 1817)
26 October – Haagen Mathiesen, timber merchant (died 1842).
9 November – Frederik Petersen, painter (died 1825)
30 November - Just Henrik Ely, military officer (died 1824).

Full date unknown
Lars Larsen Forsæth, farmer and politician (died 1839).

Deaths
8 January - Rasmus Paludan, bishop (b. 1702).
24 March - Mathias Collett, civil servant (b. 1708).

See also

References